Lupin is a French mystery thriller streaming television series created by George Kay and François Uzan that premiered on Netflix on 8 January 2021. The series consists of ten episodes, with the first five released in January 2021 and the remainder on 11 June 2021. Netflix has renewed Lupin for a third part.

The show stars Omar Sy in the role of Assane Diop, a man who is inspired by the adventures of master thief Arsène Lupin, a character created by Maurice Leblanc in the early 1900s. The first part, consisting of five episodes, is subtitled Dans l'ombre d'Arsène (In the Shadow of Arsène), referring to the primary character's inspiration. The series was watched by 70 million households during its first month, becoming the most-watched non-English series on Netflix at the time.

Synopsis
The story follows professional thief Assane Diop, the only son of an immigrant from Senegal who had come to France to seek a better life for his child. Assane's father is framed for the theft of an expensive diamond necklace by his employer, the wealthy and powerful Hubert Pellegrini, and hangs himself in his prison cell out of shame, leaving the teenage Assane an orphan. Twenty-five years later, inspired by a book about gentleman thief Arsène Lupin his father had given him on his birthday, Assane sets out to get revenge on the Pellegrini family, using his charisma and mastery of thievery, subterfuge, and disguise to expose Hubert's crimes.

Cast and characters

Main
 Omar Sy as Assane Diop, a gentleman thief who styles himself after Arsène Lupin and vows to avenge his father's death.
 Mamadou Haidara as young Assane Diop
 Ludivine Sagnier as Claire, Assane's estranged wife and the mother of his child, of whom she has full custody.
 Ludmilla Makowski as young Claire
 Clotilde Hesme as Juliette Pellegrini, the daughter of wealthy entrepreneur Hubert Pellegrini.
 Léa Bonneau as young Juliette Pellegrini
 Nicole Garcia as Anne Pellegrini, Hubert's wife.
 Hervé Pierre as Hubert Pellegrini, an unscrupulous business tycoon who once employed Assane's father, Babakar.
 Antoine Gouy as Benjamin Ferel, Assane's best friend from his school days, who currently works as an antiquarian.
 Adrian Valli de Villebonne as young Benjamin Ferel
 Fargass Assandé as Babakar Diop, Assane's late father, who was falsely accused of having stolen the Pellegrinis' diamond necklace.
 Soufiane Guerrab as Youssef Guédira, a detective who uses his knowledge of the Arsène Lupin books to track Assane's activity.
 Vincent Londez as Captain Romain Laugier, a police captain tasked with retrieving the Pellegrinis' necklace.
 Shirine Boutella as Lieutenant Sofia Belkacem, a lieutenant detective.
 Vincent Garanger as Gabriel Dumont, the commissioner of the Paris police department.
 Johann Dionnet as young Gabriel Dumont
 Etan Simon as Raoul, the son of Assane and Claire.

Supporting
 Anne Benoît as Fabienne Bériot (part 1), a disgraced former journalist who came close to exposing Hubert's misdeeds.
 Adama Niane as Léonard Koné (parts 1–2), an ex-convict and assassin employed by Hubert.
 Nicolas Wanczycki as Pascal Oblet (part 2), an undercover police officer who works closely with Hubert.
 Stefan Crepon as Philippe Courbet (part 2), a young stockbroker who is not all he seems.

Episodes

Part 1 (2021)

Part 2 (2021)

Production

Development
On 19 July 2018, Netflix ordered a new series, to be produced by Gaumont Film Company, about the character Arsène Lupin, with Sy portraying the titular character. In an interview, Sy revealed that "Arsene Lupin, who is an iconic and charismatic character, will take on a new life in this modern adaptation, unique in its genre". Netflix confirmed that George Kay and François Uzan would be the showrunners, with Louis Leterrier directing the first three episodes.

Filming
Filming of the first five episodes was completed primarily in Paris, on various streets and at the Louvre, both inside and out. According to research by Condé Nast Traveler, other important locations included La Naumachie pond at Parc Monceau and Musée Nissim de Camondo on rue de Monceau; the latter stands in as the Pellegrini home and is open to the public. Other listed locations include Collège-lycée Jacques-Decour, a parking garage on Rue d'Abbeville, the Marché Biron flea market, the Jardin du Luxembourg, the Pont des Arts, L'Appartement Saint-Martin (near Porte Saint-Martin), and the Maison d'Arrêt de Bois-d'Arcy prison. The publication adds that parts of the fifth episode were filmed in the town of Étretat, which is located along the coast of Normandy. This location is significant because Maurice Leblanc, who created the character Arsène Lupin, lived in the municipality.

The second set of five episodes were already filmed by the end of 2020 and were released on 11 June 2021.

On 18 November 2021, Netflix and Omar Sy confirmed that filming was underway in Paris for the series' third part. Shooting continued into 2022. On 25 February, production was temporarily halted after €300,000 worth of equipment was stolen from the set, resuming three days later. A teaser trailer for the show's third part was released during Netflix's Tudum event in September 2022.

Reception

Viewership
Lupin is the first French series to rank among the top ten on Netflix in the United States, reaching number three on 10 January 2021. It was ranked number one in France and many other countries in Europe, including Germany, Austria, Italy, Spain, Denmark, and Sweden, as well as other countries such as Canada, Brazil, Argentina, and South Africa.

As of 31 January 2021, the show was watched by 76 million households, making it the second-most-successful debut ever for an original Netflix show, after Bridgerton. In April, Netflix revealed that Lupin was the most watched title on the company's streaming service in the first quarter of 2021.

On 21 July  2021, it was reported that 54 million households watched the second part of the show, a drop compared to the first installment. Lupin still managed to become one of the biggest shows during the second quarter of 2021.

Critical response
On the review aggregation website Rotten Tomatoes, the first part holds an approval rating of 98% with an average rating of 7.70/10, based on 44 reviews. The site's critical consensus reads: "Omar Sy effortlessly hits every mark in Lupin, an engrossing espionage thriller that lives up to its source material and then some." On Metacritic, the first part has a score of 82 out of 100 based on 8 reviews.

Writing for The New Paper, Jonathan Roberts stated that "if [Lupin] was a film, it would be a contender for the year's best". Daniel D'Addario of Variety wrote that the cliffhanger at the end of the first series "will leave any viewer who's taken the ride eager for more." Rolling Stone's Alan Sepinwall praised Sy's performance, writing that "it all works because [he] is so magnetic and charming that questioning plot logic feels wildly besides the point." Karen Han of Slate wrote that Lupin "doesn't waste a single minute, packing each and every moment full of suspense".

On Rotten Tomatoes, the second part holds an approval rating of 96%, with an average rating of 8.10/10, based on 28 reviews. The site's critical consensus reads: "Smart, sexy, and stylish, Lupins highly bingeable second season is perfect summer viewing". On Metacritic, the second part has a score of 80 out of 100 based on 7 reviews.

Awards and nominations

Notes

References

External links

 
 
 

2020s French drama television series
2021 French television series debuts
Television shows based on Arsène Lupin
French action adventure television series
French-language Netflix original programming
Nonlinear narrative television series
Television series set in 1995
Television series set in 2005
Television shows set in France